We Are Veneto (Siamo Veneto, SV) is a Venetian nationalist and separatist political party in Italy, based in Veneto.

History
The party was formed in March 2016 when Antonio Guadagnini, leader of Veneto State (VS) and member of the Regional Council of Veneto elected on the Independence We Veneto's slate, changed his affiliation in the Council and established the new party. SV was the practical successor of VS, and, other than Guadagnini, its founding members included Marco Busato (a former treasurer of VS) and Giacomo Mirto (a former leader of Independentist Youth).

At some point, the party was joined also by Lucio Chiavegato.

In July 2018 SV signed a political pact with Venetian Independence (IV), Veneto's leading separatist party.

Between April and October 2019 SV was a founding member of the Party of Venetians.

References

External links
Official website

Political parties in Veneto
Venetian nationalism
Political parties established in 2016
2016 establishments in Italy